Ego kai esy (Greek: Εγω και εσύ; English: Me and you) is the 15th studio album by Greek singer Yannis Parios. It was released in Greece in 1985 by Minos EMI. It contains the greatest hit of the singer "Kokkino Garyfallo" ("Red cloves"), featuring Haris Alexiou. "Imerologio Monaksias" song from this album was covered by Alpay and Ajda Pekkan, who are famous Turkish singers. Alpay covered it as "Hayalimdeki Resim" ("Picture in my dream" in Turkish) with lyrics of Fecri Ebcioğlu at "Hayalimdeki Resim" album, was released in 1987. Ajda Pekkan covered it as "Yalnızlık Yolcusu" ("Passenger of loneliness" in Turkish) with lyrics of Fikret Şeneş at "Süperstar 4" ("Superstar 4" in Turkish) album, was released in 1987. However, Alpay's cover was more successful than Ajda's and "Hayalimdeki Resim" was the most successful work for him.

Track listing

Personnel 

Personnel
Nikos Ignatiadis -  orchestration
P. Anastasiadis - violin
N. Anyfantakis - harmonica
H. Zerbinos - accordion
K. Kavakos - violin
S. Kingdom - electric bass
M. Laskarakis - guitars
M. Nikoloudis - lyra
Thanasis Polikandriotis - bouzouki
S. Tahiatis - cello
F. Tsemperoulis - percussion
G. Tsoubakis - drums
Sp. Tsoutsos - violin
Lia Vissi - background vocals (as chorus)
Stelios Goulielmos - background vocals (as chorus)
Afroditi Fryda - background vocals (as chorus)
Rena Patta - second vocals

Production
Achilleas Theofilou - production manager

Credits adapted from the album's liner notes.

References

1985 albums
Minos EMI albums
Yiannis Parios albums